Borders was a US-based bookseller, headquartered in Melbourne, Australia that also specialized in CDs, DVDs, calendars, stationery, gift packs and related merchandising in the Pacific area of Asia and Australasia. It had stores internationally in New Zealand and Australia. All of the stores also were fitted with Gloria Jeans Coffees cafés. The company was the Asia-pacific franchisee of the US bookseller of the same name, but was sold off in 2007 and licensed the Borders brandname for its remaining years.

History

Borders started in 1997 with the opening of its first store in Singapore; it then later expanded to open Borders stores in Australia and New Zealand. Like its U.S. parent, it sold books, CDs, DVDs and stationery. All of the stores also had Gloria Jean's Coffee shop concessions in them. The second outlet in Singapore was opened at Parkway Parade in 2007.

To pay off debt, Borders Group sold all of its Australian, New Zealand and Singaporean stores to Pacific Equity Partners (owner of competitor Angus & Robertson) in 2008. A new company called REDgroup Retail was formed. After this transaction, the Borders stores in the US, the UK (which had also been sold off to another company but closed down in 2009 due to entering administration) and the Asia/Pacific region were owned by three wholly independent entities.

In late July 2012, Pearson Australia Group decided to re-brand the former Borders website as Bookworld.
Chief Executive James Webber told The Australian "The Borders brand had lost its former sheen. We just believe the Borders brand has had its day. There are no stores left and globally it's been in demise so we believe there's an opportunity to revitalise (the franchise) and move it forward."

All of its existing customer base was migrated over to the new Bookworld website. The Bookworld brand was itself also later rebranded as Angus & Robertson.

Administration

On 17 February 2011, REDgroup Retail (including the Borders, Angus & Robertson as well as Whitcoulls chains) were placed into voluntary administration with Ferrier Hodgson appointed as administrators. The immediate aftermath of the announcement saw the closure of 48 Angus & Robertson stores and one Borders store. The day after the announcement, customers of the surviving stores were informed that gift vouchers could only be redeemed if they also spent an equivalent amount in cash. After 3 April, unused vouchers became void.

On 6 April, RedGroup Retail announced that 16 of the 25 remaining Borders stores in Australia were to close within two months. The handling of the administration prompted 25 franchised Angus & Robertson stores to sever ties with RedGroup, rebranding themselves as independents. By the end of May, 70 of the 87 RedGroup-owned bookstores in New Zealand had been sold off: ten airport-based Whitcoulls stores to Australian-based LS Travel Retail Pacific, and another 57 Whitcoulls plus five Borders stores to the James Pascoe Group.

On 2 June 2011, the administrator announced the closure of the remaining nine Borders stores, as no buyer could be found. All stores in Australia were closed by July 2011.

The flagship Borders store at Wheelock Place in Singapore was suddenly closed on 16 August 2011, and was forced to clear out by 23 August 2011. Vouchers and gift cards from Borders Singapore bookstore were no longer accepted. After hearing that the Borders store at Wheelock Place was shutting down, some people tried to use their vouchers on the Saturday at its other outlet at Parkway Parade, but they were not allowed to do so. The books were cleared at a sale held at Singapore Expo Hall 4B, from 10am to 10pm, from 2 September 2011 to 6 September 2011. The remaining store closed on 26 September 2011 at 9 p.m., ending 14 years of sales in Singapore, just before the lease was due to end in October, but not before discounts of 70% to clear all items which started three days before its closure. On the last hours of its business in Singapore, shelves, signs, baskets and computers at the cashiers' counters were also available for sale.

Stores

In total Borders had 33 stores located across Australia, New Zealand and Singapore. All were closed due to the demise of the parent company REDgroup Retail.

See also
 REDgroup Retail

References

Bookshops of Australia
Bookshops of New Zealand
Retail companies of Singapore
Companies based in Melbourne
Bookstores established in the 20th century
Retail companies established in 1997
Retail companies disestablished in 2012
Defunct companies of Australia
Defunct companies of New Zealand
Defunct companies of Singapore